The 1997–98 Munster Rugby season was Munster's third season as a professional team, during which they competed in the IRFU Interprovincial Championship and Heineken Cup.

1997–98 squad

1997–98 IRFU Interprovincial Championship

1997–98 Heineken Cup

Pool 4

References

External links
1997–98 Munster Rugby season official site 
1997–98 Munster Rugby Heineken Cup

1997–98
1997–98 in Irish rugby union